Tomala is a Polish-language surname. It is a patronymic surname derived from the given name Tomasz. 
 Germanized forms of the surname include Thomalla and Tomalla.

Notable people with this surname include:

Dawid Tomala (born 1989), Polish race walker
Grzegorz Tomala (born 1974), Polish footballer
 (born 1994) Polish sports shooter
Michał Tomala (born 1990), Polish actor

See also

References

Polish-language surnames
Patronymic surnames